Ashim Ahluwalia (born 1972 in Mumbai, India) is a film director and screenwriter. He made his directorial debut with the feature-length documentary John & Jane (2005), which had a world premiere at the Toronto International Film Festival and a European premiere at the Berlin International Film Festival, and won him the 2005 National Film Award for Best First Non-Feature Film of a Director. This was followed by his first narrative feature film Miss Lovely, premiered at the 2012 Cannes Film Festival. which won him India's National Film Award – Special Jury Award (Feature film), and Best Production Design at the 61st National Film Awards.

Working outside the mainstream Bollywood film system, Ashim Ahluwalia is part of a new generation of Indian directors.
His unconventional films blur the lines between documentary and fiction. His short films have shown at the Tate Modern, the Centre Pompidou and at the Venice Architecture Biennale.

Early life
Ashim Ahluwalia grew up in Bombay, India. He attended the city's Cathedral and John Connon School before attending Bard College in upstate New York, from which he graduated with a BA in filmmaking in 1995.

Career
Ahluwalia began his film career with a series of experimental films made between 1993 and 2002. 
His first short, The Dust (1993), was made by reworking home movies shot by his grandfather in the 1950s.

He formed an independent production company, Future East, in 2005, providing an infrastructure for him to work outside mainstream film channels.

Ahluwalia was selected by the San Francisco Film Society as their Artist in Residence for 2013.

In May 2013, he received the Charles Flint Kellogg Award in Arts and Letters from Bard College, his alma mater. The award is "given in recognition of a significant contribution to artistic or literary heritage."

In November 2013, he was selected to be on the jury of the 8th edition of the Rome Film Festival for the CinemaXXI section.

In 2010, Ahluwalia was named "one of the ten best emerging film directors working today" by Phaidon Press in "Take 100: The Future of Film".

Filmography

Films 

 Thin Air (1999)
 John & Jane (2005)
 Miss Lovely (2012)
 Events in A Cloud Chamber (2016)
 Daddy (2017)
 The Field Guide to Evil (2018)

Web series 

 Class (Season 1) on Netflix (2023)

Awards 
 Indian National Film Award (2007) - Best Non-Fiction Film for John & Jane
 Indian National Film Award (2013) - Special Jury Award (Feature Film) for Miss Lovely
 Indian National Film Award (2013) - Best Production Design for Miss Lovely

Notes

References
Koehler, Robert. (13 October 2005), "John & Jane". Variety
Stone, Susan (9 March 2006), "Indian by Day, American by Night". Der Spiegel.
Pasolini, Antonio. "Dispatch: The Osnabrück Media Art Festival, Germany, 10–14 May 2006". kamera.co.uk. Retrieved 15 November 2011

External links 

 John & Jane: HBO Website 
 John & Jane: Official Website John & Jane: Official Website

1972 births
Living people
Indian male screenwriters
Indian experimental filmmakers
Hindi film producers
Bard College alumni
Hindi-language film directors
Film directors from Mumbai
Cathedral and John Connon School alumni
Indian Sikhs
21st-century Indian film directors
Best Production Design National Film Award winners
Ahluwalia